The St. Ferdinand the King Cathedral, also called Resistencia Cathedral is the name given to a Catholic church located in the city of Resistencia, Argentina. It is the seat of the Archdiocese of Resistencia. It is at the head of an ecclesiastical province which covers the provinces of Chaco and Formosa. It was built in the 1930s.

On July 3, 1939, Pope Pius XII divided the diocese of Santa Fe to create the diocese of Resistance. On April 1, 1984, Pope John Paul II elevated her to the rank of archdiocese.

On May 5, 1999, the Executive Branch of the Province of Chaco, declared "cultural heritage of the province," the building of the Cathedral of Resistance.

In late 2008 they began deep, both internal and external renovations that have a completion date for Easter Sunday 2009.

See also
Roman Catholicism in Argentina
Ferdinand III of Castile

References

Roman Catholic cathedrals in Argentina
Resistencia, Chaco
20th-century Roman Catholic church buildings in Argentina
Roman Catholic churches completed in the 1930s